Sustainable product development (SPD) is a method for product development that incorporates a Framework for Strategic Sustainable Development (FSSD), also known as The Natural Step (TNS) framework. As the demand for products continues to increase around the world and environmental factors like climate change increasingly affect policies - and thus business - it becomes more and more of a competitive advantage for businesses to consider sustainability aspects early on in the product development process.

SPD is not limited to the actual product development, but also the product design. Green design which is a part of SPD has two main goals: the prevention of waste and to minimize environmental impact. Environmental impact involves: deforestation, greenhouse gas emissions, and resource/material management, etc. The early stages of design tend to be the areas that effect the environment the worst, the extraction and refining.

References

Byggeth S. H., Broman G., Holmberg J., Lundqvist U., and Robèrt K-H., A Method for Sustainable Product Development in Small and Medium Sized Enterprises, Third International Symposium on Tools and Methods of Competitive Engineering - TMCE2000, Delft University of Technology, Delft, the Netherlands, April 18–21, 2000.
Byggeth S. H., Broman G., Lundqvist U., Robèrt K-H., and Holmberg J., An Approach to Sustainability Product Analysis in Product Development, ERCP 2001 7th European Roundtable on Cleaner Production, Lund, Sweden, May 2–4, 2001.
Charter, M. (1998) Design for Environmental Sustainability, Foresight, Natural Resources and Environment Panel: Cleaner Technologies and Processes (London, UK: Office of Science and Technology, Department of Trade & Industry).
Martin and Schouten, 2012. Sustainable Marketing

Literature

See also
 Sustainable design
 Strategic Sustainable Development

Product development
Sustainable technologies